The Fifth Discipline: The Art and Practice of the Learning Organization  is a book by Peter Senge (a senior lecturer at MIT) focusing on group problem solving using the systems thinking method in order to convert companies into learning organizations. The five disciplines represent approaches (theories and methods) for developing three core learning capabilities: fostering aspiration, developing reflective conversation, and understanding complexity.

Content

The Five Disciplines
The five disciplines of what the book refers to as a "learning organization" discussed in the book are:

 "Personal mastery is a discipline of continually clarifying and deepening our personal vision, of focusing our energies, of developing patience, and of seeing reality objectively."
 "Mental models are deeply ingrained assumptions, generalizations, or even pictures of images that influence how we understand the world and how we take action."
 "Building shared vision - a practice of unearthing shared pictures of the future that foster genuine commitment and enrollment rather than compliance."
 "Team learning starts with 'dialogue', the capacity of members of a team to suspend assumptions and enter into genuine 'thinking together'."
 "Systems thinking - The Fifth Discipline that integrates the other four."

Senge describes extensively the role of what he refers to as "mental models," which he says are integral in order to "focus on the openness needed to unearth shortcomings" in perceptions. The book also focuses on "team learning" with the goal of developing "the skills of groups of people to look for the larger picture beyond individual perspectives." In addition to these principles, the author stresses the importance of "personal mastery" to foster "the personal motivation to continually learn how [...] actions affect [the] world."

The Learning Disabilities
In addition to "disciplines," which Senge suggests are beneficial to what he describes as a "learning organization," Senge also posits several perceived deleterious habits or mindsets, which he refers to as "learning disabilities."

 "I am my position."
 "The enemy is out there."
 The Illusion of Taking Charge
 The Fixation on Events
 The Parable of the Boiling frog
 The Delusion of Learning from Experience
 The Myth of the Management Team

The 11 Laws of the Fifth Discipline
 Today's problems come from yesterday's "solutions."
 The harder you push, the harder the system pushes back.
 Behavior grows better before it grows worse.
 The easy way out usually leads back in.
 The cure can be worse than the disease.
 Faster is slower.
 Cause and effect are not closely related in time and space.
 Small changes can produce big results...but the areas of highest leverage are often the least obvious.
 You can have your cake and eat it too ---but not all at once.
 Dividing an elephant in half does not produce two small elephants.
 There is no blame.

Reception
In 1997, Harvard Business Review identified The Fifth Discipline as one of the seminal management books of the previous 75 years.

See also 
 Agile management
 Learning agenda
 Organizational learning
 System archetype

References

External links 
 

1990 non-fiction books
Systems theory books
Business books